Anton Dimitrov (born 12 August 1970) is a retired Bulgarian football striker.

References

1970 births
Living people
Bulgarian footballers
PFC CSKA Sofia players
PFC Slavia Sofia players
Association football forwards